Thanungattilthodu is a tributary stream of the Pamba River, the third longest river in the South Indian state of Kerala. It flows through the town of Kozhencherry in Pathanamthitta District.

Rivers of Pathanamthitta district
Pamba River